Mayfield Park may refer to

 Mayfield Park, Bristol, a suburb of Bristol, England
 Mayfield Park, a suburb of Bournemouth, England
 Mayfield Park, Edinburgh, a recreational area in Newington, Scotland (see Hibernian F.C.)
 Mayfield Park, Gauteng, a suburb of Johannesburg, South Africa
 Mayfield Park, Manchester, a public park in Manchester city centre, England
 Mayfield Park, Southampton,  a recreational area in the suburb of Woolston, Southampton, England
 Mayfield Park (Austin,Texas), a historic natural area in west Austin.